The Whately Chair of Political Economy was established at Trinity College, Dublin by Richard Whately, in 1832. It was initially tenable for five years.

Holders
1832 Mountifort Longfield
1836 Isaac Butt
1840 James Anthony Lawson
1846 William Neilson Hancock
1851 Richard Hussey Walsh
1856 John Elliot Cairnes
1861 Arthur Houston
1866 J. Slattery
1871 Robert Cather Donnell
1876 James Johnston Shaw
1882–1932 Charles Francis Bastable, whose tenure saw a change of system.
1934–1967 George Duncan
1967–1979 Louden Ryan
1979–2004 Dermot McAleese
Philip Richard Lane, current holder

Notes

1832 establishments in Ireland
Political Economy, Whately
Political Economy, Whately